India–Kyrgyzstan relations are the relations between India and Kyrgyzstan.

History 
Historically, India has had close contacts with Central Asia, especially countries which were part of the ancient Silk Route, including Kyrgyzstan. During the Soviet era, India and the Kirghiz Soviet Socialist Republic had limited political, economic and cultural contacts.

Former Prime Minister Rajiv Gandhi visited Bishkek and Issyk Kul Lake in 1985. Since the independence of Kyrgyz Republic on 31 August 1991, India was among the first to establish diplomatic relations in 1992; the resident Mission of India was set up in 1994.

Relations

Political relations
Political ties with the Kyrgyz Republic have been traditionally warm and friendly. The Kyrgyz leaderships have been largely supportive of India's stand on Kashmir and have welcomed the ongoing peace process. Kyrgyzstan also supports India's bid for a permanent seat at the United Nations Security Council and India's full membership in the Shanghai Cooperation Organization (SCO).

Both countries share common concerns on threat of terrorism, extremism and drug–trafficking. Since the establishment of diplomatic relations in 1992, the two countries have signed several framework agreements, including on Culture, Trade and Economic Cooperation, Civil Aviation, Investment Promotion and Protection, Avoidance of Double Taxation, Consular Convention etc.

At the institutional level, the 8th round of Foreign Office Consultation was held in Bishkek on 27 April 2016. The Indian delegation was led by Ms. Sujata Mehta, Secretary (West), Ministry of External Affairs and the Kyrgyz side was headed by Mr. Azamat Usenov, Deputy Minister of Foreign Affairs. The 7th Foreign Office Consultation was also held at Bishkek on 19 March 2015. The Indian side was headed by secretary (West) and the Kyrgyz side by Mr. Erines Otorbaev, the Kyrgyz Deputy Minister of Foreign Affairs. An Indo-Kyrgyz Joint Commission on Trade, Economic, Scientific and Technological Cooperation was set up in 1992. Seven sessions of the Joint Commission have been held so far. The 7th Session of India-Kyrgyz Inter-Governmental Commission on Trade, Economic, Scientific and Technological Cooperation was held in New Delhi on 17–18 March 2015 and a protocol was signed between the two countries. MOUs on cooperation in the field of (i) textiles and (ii) hydropower between the two countries was also signed.

The Indo-Kyrgyz diplomatic relations reached its 20th year in 2012. India announced its Connect Central Asia Policy during the visit of the Indian Minister of State for External Affairs (MoS EA), Shri E. Ahamed to Kyrgyzstan on 10–13 June 2012 with the first India-Central Asia Track-II Dialogue held in Bishkek. In his inaugural address, MoS EA declared India's intention to establish e-Network in Central Asia to promote tele-medicine and tele-education. During the visit, he met Kyrgyz Prime Minister Omurbek Babanov and held bilateral talks with the Kyrgyz Foreign Minister Ruslan Kazakbaev.

External Affairs Minister(EAM) of India, Mr Salman Khurshid, visited Kyrgyzstan on 12–13 September 2013. On 12 September EAM met with the Minister of Foreign Affairs of Kyrgyzstan Erlan Abdyldaev and called on President Atambaev as bilateral component of his visit and thereafter he participated in the SCO Summit. On the sidelines of the SCO Summit, EAM had bilateral meetings with the Iranian President Hassan Rouhani, Mongolian President Elbegdorg and SCO Secretary General Mazentsev.

Prime Minister Narendra Modi visited Kyrgyzstan on 11–12 July 2015. The visit by an Indian Prime Minister took place after a gap of 20 years. PM Modi held meetings with the Kyrgyz President Almazbek Atambayev, Speaker Asylbek Jeenbekov and Prime Minister Temir Sariyev. During his visit PM Modi laid a wreath at the Victory Square; gifted medical equipment to the Field Hospital of the Kyrgyz Armed Forces; visited the Kyrgyz India Mountain Bio Medical Research Center; inaugurated Tele-medicine links between hospitals in Kyrgyzstan with super specialty hospitals in India and unveiled a Mahatma Gandhi statue. Four MOUs/Agreements in the field of Defence Cooperation, Culture, Election and Standardisation were signed. A joint statement by Prime Minister and President Atambayev was issued.

External Affairs Minister of India, Mrs Sushma Swaraj and Kyrgyz Foreign Minister Erlan Abdyldaev met on the sidelines of Heart of Asia Conference held in Islamabad on 8-9 December 2015 and discussed bilateral relations.

Bilateral visits
The close bilateral ties were reinforced by several high-level visits as under: 
From India:
(a) High Level visits:
i) Prime Minister Narendra Modi (11-12 July 2015)
ii) Vice President Krishan Kant (August 1999)
iii) Vice President K.R. Narayanan (September 1996)
iv) Prime Minister Narasimha Rao (September 1995)

(b) Other Visits:
i) A delegation comprising 17 military officers from Army War College led by a Brigadier (11-16 October 2015)
ii) A 5-member delegation headed by Shri Avinash Chander, Secretary (Defence R&D), DG(DRDO) and SA to RM (25 to 28 October 2014)
iii) A 16-member NDC delegation led by Major General Anurag Gupta (11-16 May 2014)
iv) EAM Shri Salman Khurshid (September 2013)
v) MoS, Minister for Commerce and Industry Smt. Daggubati Purandeswari ( July 2013) 
vi) MoS, MEA Shri E. Ahmed, (June, 2012)
vii) Raksha Mantri Shri A.K. Antony (July 2011) 
viii) Minister of Petroleum & Natural Gas, Shri Murli S. Deora (August 2007)
ix) Raksha Mantri Shri George Fernandes (November 2003)
x) EAM Shri Yashwant Sinha (January 2003)

From Kyrgyzstan:
(a) High Level visits:
i) First Deputy Prime Minister, Djoomart Otorbaev (May 2013) 
ii) President Akaev visited India four times (March 1992, April 1999, August 2002, and November 2003) 
iii) Mr. Apas Jumagulov, Prime Minister (May, 1997)
iv) Ms. Mira Jangavacheva, Vice-Prime Minister (March, 1997)

(b) Other visits:
i) Minister for Energy and Industry Mr Kubanychbek Turdubaev (March 2015) 
ii) Central Election Commission Chairman Mr Tuigunally Abdraimov (October 2014)
iii) Foreign Minister Mr Erlan Abdyldaev (February 2014)
iv) Defence Minister Maj. Gen. Taalaibek B. Omuraliev (September 2013)
v) Defence Minister Kudaiberdiev Abibilla Alymovich (September, 2011)
vi) Foreign Minister Mr. Ednan Karabaev Oskonovich (February, 2008)
vii) Defence Minister Lt. General I. Isakov (November 2005)
viii) Mr. I. A. Abdurazakov, State Secretary (April, 1997)

Parliamentary exchanges
A Parliamentary delegation led by Mr Usup Mukambaev, the then Chairman of the Legislative Assembly of the Kyrgyz Parliament, visited India from 25 July-1 August 1997. The four-member group of the Kyrgyz Parliamentarians visited India in February 1999 to study the Indian experiences in infrastructure and agricultural sectors.

Indo-Kyrgyz trade
India-Kyrgyz trade was US$38.53 million in 2014–15. India's exports to Kyrgyzstan was US$37.76 million whereas Kyrgyz exports to India was US$0.77 million. Apparel and clothing, leather goods, drugs and pharmaceuticals, fine chemicals, and tea are some of the important items in India's export basket to Kyrgyzstan.Kyrgyz exports to India consist of raw hides, metalifers ores and metal scrap etc.

The fifth and sixth session of India-Kyrgyz Joint Business Council meeting between Federation of Indian Chamber of Commerce and Industry and Kyrgyz Chamber of Commerce and Industry took place in Bishkek on 19 March 2014 and in New Delhi on 2-3 December 2014 respectively.
 
A Pharmaceutical delegation of 50 companies from India under the aegis of Pharmexcil visited Bishkek on 12–13 March 2015 to promote exports of pharmaceutical products. Six members of Agrarian Platform from Kyrgyzstan took part in the 30th Aahar International Fair 2015, an annual agricultural event organized by the Indian Trade Promotion Organization (ITPO) from 10 to 14 March 2015.‘Days of India’ were celebrated from 19 to 21 June 2015 at the biggest mall ‘Bishkek Park’. Indian companies representing textiles, handicrafts, artificial jewellery, footwear participated in it. A Round Table on agricultural cooperation was held in Bishkek on 15 July 2015. Around 110 Kyrgyz representatives of Agricultural Associations, media houses and individual farmers participated in the Round Table.

Financial assistance
In 1995, India had extended a US$5 million line of credit to Kyrgyzstan; out of this, US$2.78 million were disbursed for four projects – a plant for manufacturing toothbrushes, a polythene bag manufacturing plant, a toothpaste production plant and a pharmaceutical plant. Kyrgyz side repaid US$1.66 million and the balance amount was converted to grant.

India assisted projects
During the visit of President Akaev to India in August 2002, Government of India had offered setting up an IT development centre and a potato processing plant in Kyrgyzstan. An MoU for setting up of an IT Development Centre was signed in Bishkek on 20 March 2006. HMT (I), the Indian implementing agency, set up the Indo-Kyrgyz Centre for Information Technology in Bishkek and the centre was formally inaugurated by Indian Minister of Petroleum and Natural Gas, Shri Murli S. Deora on 15 August 2007. Presently, this centre is imparting short duration IT courses and has trained over 1000 professionals from Kyrgyzstan by now.

An MoU was signed in May, 2009 for setting up a potato processing plant (for production of Potato chips and potato flakes) at Talas, Kyrgyzstan. The project was undertaken under India's Aid to Central Asia. The plant was inaugurated by Shri E. Ahmed, MoS for External Affairs on 12 June 2012. GOI provided assistance for setting up a mountain bio-medical research centre in Kyrgyzstan at Too Ashu Pass. The centre was inaugurated on 5 July 2011 by Rakhsa Mantri Shri A. K. Antony.

Government of India provided assistance for setting up a mountain bio-medical research centre in Kyrgyzstan at Too Ashu Pass at a cost of R 6.5 crores. The centre was inaugurated on 5 July 2011 by Rakhsa Mantri Shri A K Antony.

Technical cooperation
Technical assistance under the Indian Technical and Economic Cooperation (ITEC) Program, particularly in terms of human resources development, is the cornerstone of India's economic involvement in Kyrgyzstan. Kyrgyzstan has utilized 85 slots for 2014–15. More than 1040 professionals from Kyrgyzstan have received training in India since 1992. 90 slots have been received for 2015–16.

Education and culture
An Agreement on Cooperation in the spheres of culture, was recently signed during the visit of PM Modi in July 2015 to replace the agreement on Culture, arts, education, science, mass-media and sports of 18 March 1992. In general, there is appreciation of Indian culture. The Centre for Indian Studies set up in Osh State University in 1997 has been useful in providing an exposure to Indian culture and civilization to academicians and intelligentsia in this country. The chair has been discontinued since 2010 unrest in Osh. Two workshops of Kathak dance were conducted one each in Bishkek (January 2014) and Issyk-kul (July 2014). A 10-member Bhangra Dance group “Bhola Panchi”, sponsored by ICCR, performed in Bishkek on 18 October and in Kara-Balta on 19 October 2014. An India Study Centre was established by the Mission in the prestigious National Library of Kyrgyzstan in Bishkek and inaugurated on 14 November 2014. A seven-member Sitar (Fusion) group led by Pandit Prateek Chaudhuri, sponsored by ICCR, performed in Bishkek and Osh on 28-29 March 2015 respectively. A renowned Indian musician Shri Dhruba Ghosh, Principal of Bhartiya Vidya Bhavan, Mumbai, performed in Bishkek along with a Central Asian Orchestra on 5 August 2015. A troupe, Natya STEM Dance Kampani, sponsored by ICCR performed in the most prestigious Kyrgyz National Philharmony Hall on 20 October 2015.

Indians in Kyrgyzstan
About 16,000 Indian students are studying medicine in various medical institutions across the country. A few businessmen are engaged in trade and services in Kyrgyzstan. Many Indian food restaurants are also opened across Bishkek.

See also 
 Foreign relations of India 
 Foreign relations of Kyrgyzstan

References

External links 
 Ministry of External Affairs India
 Ministry of the Foreign Affairs of the Kyrgyz Republic

 
Kyrgyzstan
Bilateral relations of Kyrgyzstan